Pumpkin bread is a type of moist quick bread made with pumpkin. The pumpkin can be cooked and softened before being used or simply baked with the bread; using canned pumpkin renders it a simpler dish to prepare. Additional ingredients include nuts (such as walnuts) and raisins.

Pumpkin bread is usually baked in a rectangular loaf pan and is often made in late fall when fresh pumpkins are available. It can also be made from canned pumpkin, resulting in a stronger pumpkin taste.

See also
 Banana bread
 List of squash and pumpkin dishes
 List of quick breads

References

Further reading

External links

Quick breads
Sweet breads
Squash and pumpkin dishes